Capri Records Ltd. is a jazz record label founded by record collector, photographer, and recording engineer Thomas C. Burns. Burns formed the Capri label following his Record Revival store which is now known as Jazz Record Revival, along with his future Tapestry Records label. The Colorado-based Capri Records has a catalog of more than one hundred titles by musicians such as bassists Ray Brown and Red Mitchell, trombonists Al Grey and Phil Wilson, saxophonist Bud Shank and drummer Louie Bellson.

History
Thomas C. Burns founded Capri Records in Denver, Colorado in 1984 while concentrating on musicians with ties to Colorado.  Capri Records began producing albums with locally linked musicians such as Fred Hess, Ron Miles, Spike Robinson, Keith Oxman, and Ellyn Rucker.

Burns' Capri Records also released albums with many more artists outside of Colorado including musicians Ray Brown, Ron Miles, Jimmy Rowles and Mike Jones.

From 1987 through the early 1990s, Burns produced albums receiving multiple honors and awards.  The Clayton-Hamilton Jazz Orchestra received a Grammy Award nomination for their album Groove Shop and also received two Golden Feather Awards. 

In 2013 Jeff Hamilton and his trio recorded an album with actor Wilford Brimley; Gary Smulyan wanted to make a recording of Neapolitan melodies with actor and singer Dominic Chianese, who was known for his vocal treatments of classic Italian tunes. Ali Ryerson (participated with Holly Hofmann and Frank Wess in the 2006 album Flutology) approached Tom Burns with the idea of an all-flute big band and recorded Game Changer.

Artists

 Louie Bellson
 Joe Bonner
 Joshua Breakstone
 Ray Brown
 Clayton/Hamilton Jazz Orchestra
 Bob Cooper
 John Fedchock
 Curtis Fuller
 Joe Gilman
 Al Grey
 Jeff Hamilton Trio
 Atsuko Hashimoto
 Fred Hess
 Ernie Krivda
 Ron Miles
 Red Mitchell
 Grachan Moncur III
 Stephanie Nakasian
 Ken Peplowski
 Frank Potenza
 Spike Robinson
 Jimmy Rowles
 Ali Ryerson
 Bud Shank
 Gary Smulyan
 Jiggs Whigham
 Phil Wilson
 Mike Wofford
 Phil Woods

Discography

Tapestry Records Recorded Albums 

 Ellyn Rucker and Friends, Thoughts of You 
 Ron Miles, Trio 
 Joshua Breakstone, Tomorrow's Hours
 Mark Masters Ensemble, American Jazz Institute Presents The Clifford Brown Project	
 Flutology, First Date 
 Mark Masters, One Day With Lee
 Phil Wilson's Pan American All-Stars, Celebrate the Music of Antonio Carlos Tom Jobim
 Curtis Fuller, I Will Tell Her 
 Chip Stephens Trio, Relevancy 
 Mike Wofford, It's Personal 
 Tom Kennedy, Just Play 
 Mark Masters, Everything You Did
 Ali Ryerson and the Jazz Flute Big Band, Game Changer
 Ken Peplowski, Maybe September
 Jeff Hamilton, Wilford Brimley with the Jeff Hamilton Trio
 Frank Potenza, For Joe
 Mike Jones Trio, Plays Well with Others
 Gary Smulyan/Dominic Chianese, Bella Napoli
 Joshua Breakstone, With the Wind and the Rain

References

External links 
Official website

American jazz record labels